Jacob "Jac" Nellemann (born 19 April 1944, in Copenhagen) is a former racing driver from Denmark. Reaching Formula One in 1976, his single entry was at the 1976 Swedish Grand Prix, driving Brabhams run by the small RAM team. Despite taking part in qualifying sessions in two cars, a BT42 and a BT44B, he failed to qualify. He was on the entry list for the following year's race, but he was not present for qualifying.

Complete Formula One results
(key)

Footnotes

References

1944 births
Living people
Danish racing drivers
Danish Formula One drivers
RAM Racing Formula One drivers
Sportspeople from Copenhagen